Avanhard (sports society) was a trade unions sports society of the Ukrainian SSR. Created in 1957, it was uniting workers of industry and construction from 14 other sport societies such as "Torpedo", "Shakhtar", "Khimik", "Chervona Zirka", "Chervonyi Prapor", "Budivelnyk", and others.

Brief description

On January 1, 1977, it accounted for 3,199 primary collectives with over two millions of sportsmen.

The society was cultivating 49 types of sports. It was composed of such famous sports clubs as Metalurh Zaporizhia, Zorya Luhansk, Stal Dnipropetrovsk, Sudobudivnyk Mykolaiv, Budivelnyk Kyiv, and others.

In 1982 the society merged with its Russian counterpart "Trud".

In 1991 the society was recognized as a parent organization of the newly established sports society "Ukraina".

Olympic laureates

1952 Summer Olympics (as Budivelnyk)

1956 Summer Olympics

1960 Summer Olympics

1964 Summer Olympics

1968 Summer Olympics

1972 Summer Olympics

1972 Winter Olympics

1976 Winter Olympics

External links
 Avanhard (sports society) at Ukrainian Soviet Encyclopedia
 Court case at economical court of the Sumy Region on organization's succession

 
Sports societies in the Ukrainian Soviet Socialist Republic
1957 establishments in Ukraine
Federation of Trade Unions of Ukraine